Eglantine Rembauville-Nicolle (born 1981, also credited as Eglantine Rembauville) is a French film actress active in French and British cinema and television. She is notable for roles in Scenes of a Sexual Nature, The Bill and The Da Vinci Code, and the French television series Le bleu de l'océan.

External links

1981 births
French film actresses
French television actresses
Living people